The 2018–19 season was the 50th season of competitive association football in Australia.

National teams

Australia men's national soccer team

Friendlies
The following is a list of friendlies played by the men's senior national team in 2018–19.

AFC Asian Cup

Australia men's national under-23 soccer team

Friendlies
The following is a list of friendlies played by the men's under 23 national team in 2018–19.

AFC U-23 Championship qualification

Australia men's national under-20 soccer team

Friendlies

The following is a list of friendlies played by the men's under 20 national team in 2018–19.

AFC U-19 Championship

Australia men's national under-17 soccer team

Friendlies
The following is a list of friendlies played by the men's under 17 national team in 2018–19.

AFC U-16 Championship

Australia women's national soccer team

Friendlies
The following is a list of friendlies played by the women's senior national team in 2018–19.

Tournament of Nations

Cup of Nations

FIFA Women's World Cup

Australia women's national under-20 soccer team

AFF Women's Championship

2019 AFC Women's Championship qualification

Australia women's national under-17 soccer team

Friendlies
The following is a list of friendlies played by the women's under 17 national team in 2018–19.

AFC U-16 Women's Championship qualification

AFC competitions

AFC Champions League

Group stage

Group F

Group H

Men's football

A-League

Finals series

Elimination-finals

Semi-finals

Grand final

National Premier Leagues

The Final Series featured the winner of each Member Federation's league competition in the National Premier Leagues, with the overall winner qualifying directly for the 2019 FFA Cup Round of 32.

State club winners
These are the winners for each top-tier state competition in 2019.

Cup competitions

FFA Cup

Final

Women's football

W-League

Finals series

Deaths
 Darren Stewart, 52, former Australia, Newcastle Rosebud, APIA Leichhardt, and Newcastle Breakers defender.
 David Cervinski, 48, former Melbourne Knights, North Geelong Warriors, Carlton SC, and Wollongong Wolves defender.

Retirements
 28 July 2018: Ljubo Milicevic, 37, former Australia, Melbourne Knights, Perth Glory, Melbourne Victory, and Newcastle Jets defender.
 11 August 2018: Michael Beauchamp, 37, former Australia, Marconi Stallions, Parramatta Power, Central Coast Mariners, Melbourne Heart, Sydney FC, and Western Sydney Wanderers defender.
 12 August 2018: Dylan Macallister, 36, former Sydney Olympic, Northern Spirit, Central Coast Mariners, Wellington Phoenix, Gold Coast United, and Melbourne Heart striker.
 28 August 2018: Luke Wilkshire, 36, former Australia and Sydney FC defender.
 17 September 2018: Gülcan Koca, 28, former Turkey and Melbourne Victory defender.
 20 September 2018: Anna Green, 28, former New Zealand, Adelaide United, and Sydney FC defender.
 13 November 2018: Ante Covic, 43, former Australia, Marconi Stallions, Newcastle Jets, Melbourne Victory, Western Sydney Wanderers, and Perth Glory goalkeeper.
 7 January 2019: Adrian Leijer, 32, former Australia, Melbourne Knights, and Melbourne Victory defender.
 30 January 2019: Kalifa Cissé, 35, former Mali and Central Coast Mariners defender.
 29 March 2019: Tim Cahill, 39, former Australia and Melbourne City striker.
 4 April 2019: Brendon Santalab, 36, former Parramatta Power, Sydney United, Sydney FC, North Queensland Fury, Western Sydney Wanderers, and Perth Glory striker.
 12 April 2019: Carl Valeri, 34, former Australia and Melbourne Victory midfielder.
 15 April 2019: Alex Brosque, 35, former Australia, Marconi Stallions, Brisbane Roar, and Sydney FC forward and midfielder.
 17 April 2019: Matt McKay, 36, former Australia, Brisbane Strikers, Eastern Suburbs, and Brisbane Roar midfielder.
 22 April 2019: Bruce Djite, 32, former Australia, Adelaide United, and Gold Coast United striker.
 2 May 2019: Marcelo Carrusca, 35, former Adelaide United, Melbourne City, and West Adelaide midfielder.
 9 May 2019: Eugene Galekovic, 37, former Melbourne Knights, Eastern Pride, South Melbourne, Melbourne Victory, Adelaide United, and Melbourne City goalkeeper.
 17 May 2019: Manny Muscat, 34, former Sunshine George Cross, Green Gully, Wellington Phoenix, and Melbourne City defender.
 11 June 2019: Aaron Hughes, 39, former Northern Ireland and Melbourne City defender.
 24 June 2019: Jop van der Linden, 28, former Sydney FC defender.

References

External links
 Football Federation Australia official website

 
 
Seasons in Australian soccer
2018–19 in Australian women's soccer